The Brothers García is an American teen sitcom created by Jeff Valdez, Mike Cevallos, and Gibby Cevallos. It was among the first projects of Sí TV, an effort to produce programming featuring Latino characters that are aimed at a diverse audience. The series was billed as the first English-language sitcom to have an all Latino cast and creative team. It aired on Nickelodeon from July 2000 to August 2004. After the show, Sí TV launched its own cable-television network.

In 2021, co-creator Jeff Valdez announced that he had obtained the rights to make a sequel series. The reboot was ordered by HBO Max and it is controlled entirely by Valdez's company, New Cadence Productions.

Overview
The series follows the life of the Mexican American García family, as narrated by the adult version of one of the family's sons, Larry. Larry recounts his life alongside George, Carlos, and Lorena (his two brothers and fraternal twin sister, respectively), and the way they deal with everyday problems such as school, work, growing up, and all living in one house in San Antonio, Texas.

The series is about boys being boys, with Larry, George and Carlos Garcia putting brotherly love to the test. The Brothers Garcia makes television history as the first English language sitcom with an all Latino cast, directors, and producers. From his funny, now adult perspective, Larry Garcia recalls his quest as an 11-year-old to fit in with his older brothers (13-year-old athletic Carlos and George, a 12-year-old walking encyclopedia) and to express his individuality, despite the attention-getting behavior of his fraternal twin sister Lorena. Ray is a proud father who works as a history professor and his wife Sonia works as a strict hairdresser from an in-house salon who always attempts to make her kids the best they can be. The show is narrated by John Leguizamo as the voice of Adult Larry.

Episodes

Cast

Main
 Carlos Lacámara as Ray García
 Ada Maris as Sonia García
 Jeffrey Licon as Carlos García
 Bobby Gonzalez as George García
 Vaneza Pitynski as Lorena García
 Alvin Alvarez as Larry García
 John Leguizamo as Adult Larry García (voice)

Recurring 
 Lupe Ontiveros as Abuelita (4 episodes)
 James Santigo as CJ
 Jerry Messing as Tiny
 Kay Panabaker as Carrie Bauer
 Camille Guaty as Alex (3 episodes)
 Penn Badgley as Eddie Bauer (2 episodes)
 Natalie Amenula as Christina Contreras (2 episodes)
 George Lopez as Mr. Fender (2 episodes)

Broadcast
The show aired in reruns on "Nick on CBS" from March 13, 2004 to September 4, 2004. Reruns on The N started on April 7, 2008, and ended on May 23, 2008.

Sequel

A sequel series to The Brothers García, consisting of ten episodes and titled The Garcias aired on April 14, 2022. The original six main cast members reprised their roles in the sequel.

Awards and nominations

References

External links
 

2000s American single-camera sitcoms
2000s American teen sitcoms
2000 American television series debuts
2004 American television series endings
2000s Nickelodeon original programming
Teenage pregnancy in television
English-language television shows
Television shows set in San Antonio
Television series about brothers
Television series about children
Television series about families
Television series about teenagers
Latino sitcoms